Yevgeni Viktorovich Nemets (born 19 January 1973) is a former Russian football player.

References

1973 births
Living people
Soviet footballers
Russian footballers
FC Kuban Krasnodar players
Russian Premier League players
FC SKA Rostov-on-Don players
FC Slavyansk Slavyansk-na-Kubani players

Association football defenders